Salvador Sánchez Peñuelas (born 23 October 1951) is a Mexican politician from the Institutional Revolutionary Party. In 2009, he served as Deputy of the LX Legislature of the Mexican Congress representing Sonora.

References

1951 births
Living people
Politicians from Sonora
Institutional Revolutionary Party politicians
21st-century Mexican politicians
Deputies of the LX Legislature of Mexico
Members of the Chamber of Deputies (Mexico) for Sonora